Events in 1979 in Japanese television.

Debuts
 Anne of Green Gables, anime (1979)
 Doraemon, anime (1979 - 2005)
 Battle Fever J, tokusatsu (1979–1980)
 Kamen Rider (Skyrider), tokusatsu (1979–1980)
 Kinpachi-sensei (1st series), drama (1979–1980)
 Megaloman, tokusatsu (1979)
 Mobile Suit Gundam, anime (1979-1980)
 Supergirl, crime drama (1979–1980)
 The Ultraman, anime (1979–1980)
 The Rose of Versailles, anime (1979-1980)

Ongoing shows
Music Fair, music (1964–present)
Mito Kōmon, jidaigeki (1969–2011)
Sazae-san, anime (1969–present)
Ōedo Sōsamō, anime (1970–1984)
Ōoka Echizen, jidaigeki (1970–1999)
Star Tanjō!, talent (1971–1983)
FNS Music Festival, music (1974–present)
Ikkyū-san, anime (1975–1982)
Panel Quiz Attack 25, game show (1975–present)

Endings
 Candy Candy, anime (1976–1979)
 Megaloman, tokusatsu (1979)
 Spider-Man, tokusatsu (1978–1979)
 The New Aim for the Ace!, anime (1978–1979)
 The Yagyu Conspiracy, drama (1978–1979)
 Spider-Man, tokusatsu (1978-1979)
 Yatterman, anime (1977–1979)
 Rose of Versailles, anime (1979-1980)

See also
1979 in anime
1979 in Japan
List of Japanese films of 1979

References